Asiadodis squilla is a species of praying mantis in the family Mantidae.  It is the type species for the genus Asiadodis.

See also
List of mantis genera and species

References

S
Mantodea of Asia
Insects described in 1869